Microfit is a statistics package developed by Bahram Pesaran and M. Hashem Pesaran, and published by Oxford University Press. It is designed for econometric modelling with time series data.

References

External links 
 Website at Oxford University Press

Time series software
Oxford University Press
Windows-only software